Shri Ekanath K. Thakur (15 February 1941 – 7 August 2014) was an Indian politician from the Shiv Sena party, born in Mhapan, Sindhudurg. He was a Member of the Parliament of India representing Maharashtra in the Rajya Sabha, the upper house of the Indian Parliament during 2002–2008.

Shri Thakur was the founder of National School of Banking, a successful training institute that prepares test takers for bank officers' exams in India. He was also Chairman of the Board of Directors of Saraswat Bank, a leading Urban Co-operative Bank in India.

B.A. (HONS.), C.A.I.I.B EX-CHAIRMAN (19TH JULY 2008 TO 7TH AUGUST 2014) 
Shri Ekanath Thakur had a Bachelors Degree in Arts (Hons.) and was also CAIIB. He was the Director of Central Board of State Bank of India that has over 13000 branches and business of nearly Rs 25 lac crore. He was a Member of Parliament, Rajya Sabha from 2002 to 2008 and was elected unopposed from State of Maharashtra.

He was a Member of Parliamentary Standing Committee on Information and Technology, Defence and Food Processing Industry. He was also Member of Parliamentary Consultative Committee on Finance and Commerce. He was the General Secretary of World Bank (PNoWB) which was presided by Dr. Manmohan Singh and subsequently by Mr. Shivraj Patil. He was Vice President and later President of All India Confederation of Bank Officers Organisations (AICBOO), a representative of 2,00,000 officers and executives working in India's Banking Industry.

In 1977, he represented India among 30,00,000 officers/ executives working in Public and Private sector in first ever World Conference for Officers held at International Labor Organisation (a branch of UNO), Geneva, Switzerland . At the conference, he was elected unopposed as Vice President of Officers Group from 127 countries. He was also elected as a member of the Drafting Committee. He was the Director of Maharashtra State Financial Corporation for four years during which he also acted as the Chairman for two years. He was the President of Maharashtra Chamber of Commerce, Industry and Agriculture. He was also on Banking and Finance Committee of FICCI and was a member of Executive Committee of International Chamber of Commerce. He was Honorary Secretary and Chief Executive Officer of Indian Education Society, one of the largest education institutions in Mumbai, having under its canopy 75 educational institutions. He was founder and Chairman of National School of Banking (NSB) which has trained over 3,00,000 plus candidates for numerous bank entrance exams through its 50 centers spread across India. He was Trustee of Kusumagraj Pratishthan, Nasik and Konkan Marathi Sahitya Parishad (Komaspaa). He was also President of Karachi Maharashtriya Shikshan Prasarak Mandal.

Award and Recognition:

 Samaj Ratna Award
 Dr. Babasaheb Ambedkar Award
 Sane Guruji Award
 Cancer Vijeta Award
 Cancer Survivor Award. (He fought the affliction of cancer for 42 years and had undergone several surgeries and radiation, etc.)Rotary International's "Lifetime Achievement Award" at the hands of Rotary International Club's Dr. Mark Maloney and in the presence of Hon'ble Shri Prafulji Patel, then Union Minister for Civil Aviation in the Rotary International's District 3140 Annual Conference held at Hotel Leela Kempinski, in the presence of thousands of Rotarians. The "Excellence in Business Communication Award" given by the Association of Business Communicators of India (ABCI). Udyog Ratna Award given by Manohar Pratishthan The national-levef W.G. Alias Annasaheb Chirmule Charitable Trust conferred the Annasaheb Chirmule Award on Shri Thakur in recognition of his outstanding work in the field of banking and finance. In October, 2011 the All India Saraswat Cultural Organisation and "the All India Saraswat Foundation conferred the prestigious 'Saraswat Ratna Award' on Shri Thakur. (11) In March 2012, he was honoured with the Outstanding Konkani of the Year-2012 by the TMA Pai Foundation, Manipal In May, 2012 he was honoured with the Maxell Lifetime Achievement Award at the hands of Shri Prithviraj Chavan, Hon'ble Chief Minister of Maharashtra by the Maxell Foundation, Maharashtra.

References

Shiv Sena politicians
Rajya Sabha members from Maharashtra
1941 births
2014 deaths
Marathi politicians